Popsicle Peak is a mountain on Vancouver Island, British Columbia, Canada, located  southeast of Gold River and  southwest of M.S. Mountain.

References

Vancouver Island Ranges
One-thousanders of British Columbia
Nootka Land District